Adam Boujamaa (born 24 October 1998) is a French professional footballer who plays as a midfielder for Championnat National 2 club Toulon.

Career
Boujamaa spent his youth with various academies in his native Toulouse, before moving to Bordeaux in 2016. He made his professional debut for in a 0–0 Ligue 2 tie with Gazélec Ajaccio on 29 March 2019.

On 13 January 2022, Boujamaa signed for Toulon.

Personal life
Born in France, Boujamaa is of Moroccan descent.

References

External links
 
 
 NR Pyrenees Profile

1998 births
Living people
Footballers from Toulouse
Association football midfielders
French footballers
French sportspeople of Moroccan descent
Toulouse FC players
Toulouse Fontaines Club players
US Colomiers Football players
En Avant Guingamp players
AS Béziers (2007) players
MC Oujda players
FC Montana players
SC Toulon players
Championnat National 2 players
Championnat National 3 players
Ligue 2 players
Championnat National players
Botola players
First Professional Football League (Bulgaria) players
French expatriate footballers
Expatriate footballers in Morocco
Expatriate footballers in Bulgaria
French expatriate sportspeople in Bulgaria
French expatriate sportspeople in Morocco